The 2023 Volleyball World Beach Pro Tour is the second edition of the global elite professional beach volleyball circuit organized by the Fédération Internationale de Volleyball (FIVB) for the 2023 beach volleyball season. Since March 2022, the Tour comprises three tiers: Future, Challenge and Elite 16. The season ends with The Finals featuring the 10 best teams in the world.

The Volleyball World Beach Pro Tour was established by FIVB in October 2021, thus it replaced the former FIVB Beach Volleyball World Tour.

Schedule

Key

Men

Women

Medal table by country

References

External links
2023 Beach Pro Tour at volleyballworld.com

 

World Tour
2023
Beach Pro Tour